Crypto-anarchism or cyberanarchism is a political ideology focusing on protection of privacy, political freedom, and economic freedom, the adherents of which use cryptographic software for confidentiality and security while sending and receiving information over computer networks. In his 1988 "Crypto Anarchist Manifesto", Timothy C. May introduced the basic principles of crypto-anarchism, encrypted exchanges ensuring total anonymity, total freedom of speech, and total freedom to trade. In 1992, he read the text at the founding meeting of the cypherpunk movement.

Terminology 

"Crypto-" comes from the Ancient Greek κρυπτός kruptós, meaning "hidden" or "secret". This is a different use of the prefix than that employed in words like 'crypto-fascist' or 'crypto-Jew' where it indicates that the identity itself is concealed from the world; rather, many crypto-anarchists are open about their anarchism and promotion of tools based in cryptology.

Motives
One motive of crypto-anarchists is to defend against surveillance of computer networks communication. Crypto-anarchists try to protect against government mass surveillance, such as PRISM, ECHELON, Tempora, telecommunications data retention, the NSA warrantless surveillance controversy, Room 641A, the FRA and so on. Crypto-anarchists consider the development and use of cryptography to be the main defense against such problems.

Anonymous trading
Bitcoin is a currency generated and secured by peer-to-peer networked devices that maintain a communal record of all transactions within the system that can be used in a crypto-anarchic context. Adrian Chen, writing for The New York Times, says the idea behind bitcoin can be traced to The Crypto Anarchist Manifesto. Silk Road was an example of an illegal drug market on which bitcoin was the only accepted currency.

Assassination Market was a Tor-based darknet market operated by a self-described crypto-anarchist going by the pseudonym Kuwabatake Sanjuro.

In The Cyphernomicon, Timothy C. May suggests that crypto-anarchism qualifies as a form of anarcho-capitalism: 

Another quote in The Cyphernomicon defines crypto-anarchism. Under the title "What is Crypto Anarchy?", May writes:

See also 
 Jim Bell — originator of the idea of assassination politics
 Cypherpunk
 Technolibertarianism

Notes

Works cited

Further reading

 
Computer law
Applications of cryptography